Gold-Diggers Sound is the third studio album by American singer Leon Bridges. It was released on July 23, 2021, by Columbia Records. The album features guest appearances from Robert Glasper, Terrace Martin, and Atia "Ink" Boggs.

The album received widespread acclaim from critics and debuted at number 17 on the US Billboard 200. It was supported by three singles: "Sweeter", "Motorbike", and "Why Don't You Touch Me". The album was nominated for Best R&B Album at the 2022 Grammy Awards.

Background and release 
The album's title is derived from the "studio, hotel and bar/speakeasy" of the same name located in East Hollywood, where Bridges lived while writing and recording the songs on the album. Bridges held a Grammys party at Gold-Diggers in 2019 and later started a residency at the hotel, bringing in musicians to collaborate with. He started by writing melodies and lyrics over their improvisations. He did not have a planned concept for most of the album's songs, but a few of the tracks did. For example, "Magnolias" is inspired by the music of Sade. However, Bridges made the conscious decision to distance himself from the sound of his debut album, Coming Home (2015), and his second album, Good Thing (2018), instead opting for an "unpredictable" approach.

On June 8, 2020, Bridges and Terrace Martin released a single titled "Sweeter" in response to the May 25 murder of George Floyd. The narrator of the song is a dead man whose mother and siblings weep over him. Gold-Diggers Sound was announced May 14, 2021, alongside the album's lead single, "Motorbike". A music video for "Motorbike", directed by Anderson .Paak, was released the same day. The album's second single, "Why Don't You Touch Me", was released on June 17, 2021. The first part of a music video for "Why Don't You Touch Me" premiered the following day on June 18, 2021; the second part was released on June 24, 2021.

Critical reception 

Gold-Diggers Sound was met with widespread critical acclaim. At Metacritic, which assigns a normalized rating out of 100 to reviews from professional publications, the album received an average score of 81, based on 12 reviews. Aggregator AnyDecentMusic? gave it 7.5 out of 10, based on their assessment of the critical consensus.

Writing for The Guardian, Max Bell hailed Gold-Diggers Sound as "a remarkable and progressive R&B album" and observed "the most eclectic compositions of Bridges' career, as well as his most emotionally transparent songwriting". Lucy Wynne from Gigwise applauded Bridges' transition from the "swinging sixties" style of his first album to this album's "progressive R&B", noting its "modern alternative R&B jams with a pop twist". Will Lavin of NME wrote that the album "maintains the traditional elements of old-school soul heard on his previous work but introduces a new, vibrant, almost luminous aesthetic, comparable to the likes of Snoh Aalegra and Brent Faiyaz." Emma Harrison of Clash praised the album's production and the strength of Bridges's songwriting. Julyssa Lopez of The New Yorker wrote that the album's songs "show that Bridges is versatile enough to stretch his skills across multiple eras, even if they never approach the future." Similarly, Pitchfork journalist Jonah Bromwich deemed it "a smooth, risk-averse R&B album whose nostalgic trappings aim for timelessness". Will Strickson from DIY enjoyed the album, saying, "While more of a slow burn than his previous efforts, Gold-Diggers Sound sees Leon Bridges shine brighter as a songwriter, as an artist and as a man than ever".

Reviewing the album for The Independent, Annabel Nugent stated, "The record is a confident immersion into a genre he's only toyed with before. And just as Good Thing never fully sacrificed Bridges' style, neither does Gold-Digger forget his roots". AllMusic critic Andy Kellman said, "Only on a couple occasions does Bridges let loose a touch while in the moment. ... Even in those moments, there is never an indication that Bridges could possibly lose his composure. The unswerving self-control he has demonstrated across three albums both impresses and mystifies". In a lukewarm review, Exclaim!s Luke Fox wrote, "Bridges loves a good love song, and nails a few here".

Industry awards

Track listing 

Notes
  signifies a co-producer
  signifies an additional producer

Personnel 
Credits adapted from the liner notes of Gold-Diggers Sound.

Musicians
 Nate Mercereau – guitar (tracks 1–3, 5, 7–10), guitar synthesizer (track 1), French horn (track 1), drums (tracks 2, 7, 10), bass (tracks 2–4, 8–10), synthesizer (tracks 2, 3), piano (tracks 2, 5, 7), percussion (tracks 3, 10), keyboards (track 4), programming (track 7), sitar guitar (track 10)
 Ricky Reed – drum programming (tracks 2, 8, 9), programming (tracks 4, 5, 7), drums (tracks 5, 7, 8)
 Steve Wyreman – guitar (tracks 4, 5, 8, 10, 11), sitar guitar (track 7), organ (track 8), percussion (track 10), organ (track 10)
 Robert Glasper – keyboards (track 1), bass (track 1)
 Keyon Harrold – trumpet (tracks 1, 6, 10), flugelhorn (track 10)
 Terrace Martin – saxophone (tracks 1, 6, 9, 10), piano (track 9), alto saxophone (track 10)
 Paris Strother – synthesizer (tracks 2, 7), piano (track 2)
 Atia "Ink" Boggs – vocals (tracks 3, 5, 8, 10)
 Amber Strother – vocals (tracks 3, 8, 10)
 Lemar Guillary – trombone (tracks 5–7, 10), horn arrangement (track 1)
 Antoine Katz – bass (track 3)
 Jordan Blackmon – sound effects (track 3)
 Mike Blankenship – keyboards (track 4)
 Zach Cooper – bass (tracks 5, 7)
 Josh Johnson – alto saxophone (tracks 5, 7)
 Cameron Johnson – trumpet (tracks 5, 7), flugelhorn (tracks 5, 7)
 Carlos Niño – percussion (tracks 10, 11)
 Josh Crumbly – piano (track 10), synthesizer (track 10), upright bass (track 11)
 Olivia Salas – strings (track 11), cello (track 11)
 DJ Stanfill – percussion (track 11), drums (track 11), piano (track 11), electric piano (track 11), synthesizer (track 11), background vocals (track 11)

Technical
 Leon Bridges – executive production
 Ricky Reed – executive production, production (all tracks), mixing (tracks 5–9, 11)
 Nate Mercereau – production (all tracks)
 Robert Glasper – production (track 1)
 9AM – production (track 4), programming (track 4)
 King Garbage – production (track 7), additional production (track 4)
 DJ Stanfill – production (track 11)
 Josh Block – co-production (tracks 1, 4), engineering (tracks 1, 4)
 Steve Wyreman – co-production (tracks 3, 5, 7, 8, 10)
 Lemar Guillary – co-production (track 6)
 Mike Blankenship – additional production (track 4)
 Jon Castelli – mixing (tracks 1–4, 10)
 John Deguzman – engineer for mix (tracks 1–4, 10)
 Brian DiMao – engineering (track 1)
 Andy Taub – engineering (track 1)
 Luke Milano – engineering (track 4)
 Bill Malina – engineering (tracks 2, 3, 5–11)
 Ethan Shumaker – engineering (tracks 2, 3, 5–11)
 James Kirk – assistant engineering (tracks 2, 3, 5–11)
 Jonathan Thompson – assistant engineering (tracks 2, 3, 5–11)
 Daddy Kev – mastering

Artwork
 Justin Hardiman – front cover photograph, back cover photograph
 Cedrick Jones – photography
 Dustin McLaughlin – photography
 Joe Greer – photography
 Cory Gehr – photography
 Tina Ibañez – art direction, design

Charts

References 

2021 albums
Columbia Records albums
Leon Bridges albums